Anxhela Peristeri (born 24 March 1986) is an Albanian singer, songwriter and model.

Life and career

1986–2015: Early life and career beginnings 

Anxhela Peristeri was born on 24 March 1986 into an Albanian family of the Eastern Orthodox faith in the city of Korçë, then People's Republic of Albania, present Albania. There, she began to pursue music and attended high school in her elementary years studying violin. Following this, the singer continued her studies and enrolled at the Jordan Misja Lyceum in Tirana. In 2001, Peristeri participated as a contestant in the Miss Albania national pageant in Tirana. After her graduation in Tirana, Peristeri and her family moved to Thessaloniki, Greece. During an interview in Greece, Peristeri stated that her paternal great-grandfather was Greek, from whom she inherited the surname Peristeri. In another interview in Greece, when asked if she considers herself Greek, she answered that she is Albanian and her connection to Greece comes from a distant ancestor, namely her great-grandfather. Describing her life in the latter country, she had stated that she experienced discrimination because of her Albanian origin.

2016–present: Kënga Magjike and Eurovision 

From March to June 2016, Peristeri appeared as a contestant on the first season of the Albanian version of Your Face Sounds Familiar and eventually emerged as the winner of the competition. A year later, she returned to compete in Kënga Magjike's 19th edition and resulted as the winner with the song "". Following her victory, her follow-up single, "", went on to reach number 73 in Albania. Another charting single, "", followed in late 2018 and peaked at number 74 in her native country. A Balkan ballad incorporating Albanian folk elements, "" was honored as the Song of the Year by the Akademia Kult at the 2019 Kult Awards, with Peristeri donating her prize winnings to victims of the 2019 Albania earthquake. Peristeri's chart success ensued into September 2019 with the single "", marking her third chart appearance. Succeeding "" in January 2020, the follow-up single, "", featuring Kosovo-Albanian singer Sinan Vllasaliu, debuted and peaked at number 100 in Albania.

In the semi-final of the Eurovision Song Contest in May 2021, Peristeri successfully qualified for the grand final and eventually finished in 21st place. Peristeri's first extended play, was released on 29 January 2022. Premiered as the record's lead single, the eponymous single, "", had reached number 76 on the last issue of Albania's Top 100 chart for the week ending on 5 March 2022.

Discography

Albums

Studio albums 
  (2004)

Extended plays 
  (2022)

Singles

As lead artist

Notes

References

External links 

1986 births
21st-century Albanian women singers
Albanian expatriates in Greece
Albanian female models
Albanian-language singers
Albanian people of Greek descent
Albanian songwriters
Eurovision Song Contest entrants for Albania
Eurovision Song Contest entrants of 2021
Festivali i Këngës winners
Kënga Magjike winners
Living people
People from Korçë
Your Face Sounds Familiar winners